Ayodelé Ikuesan (born 15 May 1985) is a French sprinter who specialises in the 60 metres and 4 × 100 metres relay. Ikuesan won the 4 × 100 m relay gold medal at the 2009 Mediterranean Games. She competed in the 60m at the 2009 European Athletics Indoor Championships,  the 4 × 100 m relay at the 2011 and 2013 World Championships, the 4 × 100 m relay at the 2008 and 2012 Olympic Games.

Personal life 
Ikuesan was born in Paris, to Nigerian parents.

References

External links 
 
 

French female sprinters
1985 births
Athletes from Paris
French people of Nigerian descent
French people of Yoruba descent
Living people
Athletes (track and field) at the 2012 Summer Olympics
Olympic athletes of France
European Athletics Championships medalists
Universiade medalists in athletics (track and field)
Mediterranean Games gold medalists for France
Mediterranean Games medalists in athletics
Athletes (track and field) at the 2009 Mediterranean Games
Universiade bronze medalists for France
Olympic female sprinters